The triple fisherman's knot is a bend knot, used to join two ends of rope together.  It is an extension of the double fisherman's knot and is recommended for tying slippery, stiff ultra-high-molecular-weight polyethylene (UHMWPE) and aramid cored ropes.  

Tying the triple fisherman's knot is nearly identical to the double fisherman's, except for a third wrap before passing the end through each half of the knot.

Testing has shown that a failure mode exists at very high loads with the double fisherman's knot in ropes using Spectra and Technora cores.  The sheath of the rope separates at the knot, and the high-lubricity core slips through the double fisherman's knot.  Although the increase in ultimate strength is small, the triple fisherman's knot does not exhibit this behavior.  This has led to the recommendation to use the triple fisherman's knot to avoid this particular failure mechanism.

The triple fisherman's knot should not be confused with the "triple-T fisherman's knot", which is more akin to a one-sided overhand bend and has significantly different properties than the triple fisherman's knot.

See also
List of bend knots
List of knots

References

Fishing knots
Climbing knots
Knots of modern origin